The Serbian Records in Swimming are the fastest time ever swum by a swimmer representing Serbia. These national records are kept/maintained by the Serbian Swimming Federation (Пливачки савез Србије / Plivački savez Srbije).

The federation keeps records for both for men and women, for both long course (50m) and short course (25m) events. Records are kept in the following events (by stroke):
freestyle: 50, 100, 200, 400, 800 and 1500;
backstroke: 50, 100 and 200;
breaststroke: 50, 100 and 200;
butterfly: 50, 100 and 200;
individual medley: 100 (25m only), 200 and 400;
relays: 200 free, 400 free, 800 free, 200 medley, and 400 medley.

All records swum in finals, unless noted otherwise.

Long Course (50 m)

Men

|-bgcolor=#DDDDDD
|colspan=9|
|-

|-bgcolor=#DDDDDD
|colspan=9|
|-

|-bgcolor=#DDDDDD
|colspan=9|
|-

|-bgcolor=#DDDDDD
|colspan=9|
|-

|-bgcolor=#DDDDDD
|colspan=9|
|-

Women

|-bgcolor=#DDDDDD
|colspan=9|
|-

|-bgcolor=#DDDDDD
|colspan=9|
|-

|-bgcolor=#DDDDDD
|colspan=9|
|-

|-bgcolor=#DDDDDD
|colspan=9|
|-

|-bgcolor=#DDDDDD
|colspan=9|
|-

Mixed relay

Note 1: For the women's, long-course 50 Breast record, SSF lists the record as 32.10 by Nađa Higl swum July 8, 2008 in Belgrade. 32.10 is Higl's 50 split from the 100 breast Final at the 2009 World University Games on July 7, 2008 in Belgrade; however, her 50 split from semi-finals at the meet was 32.08, which is what is listed here.

Short Course (25 m)

Men

|-bgcolor=#DDDDDD
|colspan=9|
|-

|-bgcolor=#DDDDDD
|colspan=9|
|-

|-bgcolor=#DDDDDD
|colspan=9|
|-

|-bgcolor=#DDDDDD
|colspan=9|
|-

|-bgcolor=#DDDDDD
|colspan=9|
|-

Women

|-bgcolor=#DDDDDD
|colspan=9|
|-

|-bgcolor=#DDDDDD
|colspan=9|
|-

|-bgcolor=#DDDDDD
|colspan=9|
|-

|-bgcolor=#DDDDDD
|colspan=9|
|-

|-bgcolor=#DDDDDD
|colspan=9|
|-

Mixed relay

See also 
 Serbian records in athletics

References

External links
Plivački Savez Srbije web site
Serbian Records swimrankings.net 4 December 2022 updated

Serbia
Records
Swimming
Swimming records